Lego: The Adventures of Clutch Powers (also known as The Adventures of Clutch Powers) is a 2010 computer-animated adventure comedy film. The film is based on the concept of the Lego toy series.

The film stars Ryan McPartlin, Yvonne Strahovski, Roger Rose, Jeff Glen Bennett, Paul Michael Glaser, Gregg Berger, Christopher Emerson and Alex Desert. The film received positive reviews for the action and humor, although the consumerism was criticized.

Plot
The film opens with the titular Clutch Powers tunnelling underground in search of a crystal, but in the process wakes up the "Crystal King" who then chases Clutch to an underground base where he then finds a stuck baby rock monster. After freeing and comforting it, the Crystal King (which happens to be the baby rock monster's parent) catches him with the baby in his arms. Clutch gives it to him and the Crystal King gives him a crystal as a reward for finding his baby. Clutch then returns to his base in Lego City and gives the crystal to his boss, Kjeld Playwell, who assigns him some new teammates: Brick Masterson, a firefighter, Peg Mooring, a biologist, and Bernie von Beam, an engineer. Playwell informs them of an incident on the Space Police prison planet.

Clutch and his team arrive on the planet and investigate the situation, despite their lack of cooperation and Clutch's intent of working alone. After seeing that someone is stuck in one of the prisoners' cells, they are attacked by an unseen wizard, who then disappear with the other two criminals. Clutch and his friends free the Watch Commander, who comforts them by stating that he removed the spark plugs of all ships to ensure that the criminals will never escape from the planet. Unfortunately, the criminals take the team's ship and destroy the other ships.

Again, the team shows their lack of cooperation when they attempt to create a ship, and Clutch decides to build the ship for the team alone after declaring that a team arguing with each other while being ordered to do their tasks is the sole reason why he always works alone. During a video call on the trip back, Clutch claims responsibility for the team's failure: he was distracted by the symbol on the Watch Commander's prison pod which referred to Omega, one of the two criminals led in the prison escape by the evil wizard. Playwell informs the team that the evil wizard is Mallock the Malign, infamous for terrorizing a medieval planet named Ashlar. The planet's ruler, the late King Revet, sacrificed his own life to ensure his kingdom's safety and Mallock's previous imprisonment. He left his son Prince Varen with his powerful golden sword to rule, despite Prince Varen's incapability of preparing in battle. Playwell then orders Clutch and the team to travel there to capture Mallock.

The team manages to get to Ashlar, but their ship accidentally knocks down Lego-Henge (a spoof of Stonehenge). They get take refuge in a seemingly abandoned medieval mine with extra parts, but not after witnessing a group of armed skeletons marching down the forest, realizing that Mallock has gained a stranglehold of Ashlar around his fortress with a joint skeleton/goblin army acting as his own forces. As Peg, Brick, and Bernie build a battle chariot, Clutch leaves to get Prince Varen to convince him to fight against Mallock. Meanwhile, in the fortress, Mallock learns of the team's presence and orders his two skeleton cronies Skelly and Bones to go after Clutch so they can find the prince and the golden sword to finalize his takeover of Ashlar.

Back in the forest, Clutch ends up at a bridge, but a troll named Hogar refuses to let him across until Clutch answers three riddles. Though Clutch gets them all right, Skelly and Bones catch up with him after a failed attempt to trap him, demanding Hogar to surrender Clutch to them. Hogar attempts to fight off the skeletons by hypnotizing them, but they don't fall for it, prompting an annoyed Hogar to swallow Clutch. He hits the skeletons with his club, runs away to a secret doorway painted like the forest, spits Clutch out on the other side of the wall and shows him the way to the castle of Prince Varen, telling him about the history of his father and the golden sword. Hogar also tells Clutch that he was the only troll on the kingdom's team and that he was assigned to protect Varen. Back at the medieval camp, Bernie is revealed to be in love with Peg, who leaves to look for an animal that made mysterious tracks, but instead encounters and befriends a dragon. Back at the castle, Clutch finds Prince Varen. However, Varen fails and gets furious at Clutch. Clutch tells him that he was trying to help him defeat the wizard's forces, but Varen rejects him, confessing that he's no match for Mallock. Fed up, Clutch goes back to the camp and sees that a dwarf will help them.

Eventually, Prince Varen, Hogar, and their knights decide to help Clutch and his team in their battle against Mallock. Varen and Clutch sneak into Mallock's castle by disguising Peg as Varen. Unfortunately, Mallock traps them in a bone cage above a lava lake while the skeleton army forces the knights to retreat. Brick, Peg, Hogar and Bernie crash their chariot into a ditch. With no choice, Hogar brings the golden sword's chest to Mallock, only to find that it's empty. Varen and Clutch send a message to the team. Bernie gains hope and they rebuild their broken chariot. They reunite with the knights and attack the skeleton army. Back in the castle, Peg summons the same dragon she encountered and tells it to destroy the cage, freeing Clutch and Varen, who then retrieve the golden sword that Varen dropped earlier. After much convincing from Clutch, Varen finally decides to face his fear of Mallock to ensure his kingdom's safety. Around the same time, Mallock attempts to trick Clutch into giving the sword to him by promising to lead him to his father, but Clutch refuses, saying that "I already found him!".

As Clutch watches Varen use the golden sword to fight against Mallock, Brick uses a jet pack to land on Mallock's fortress, where he fights Skelly and Bones. Bernie helps Brick by throwing a gear at the skeletons. Back inside the fortress, Mallock taunts Varen for retaining his title as Prince of Ashlar as he uses his staff to attack Varen. However, Varen takes enough power from Mallock's staff into his sword, allowing the sword to unleash its full power, much to Mallock's surprise. Taking the opportunity, Varen uses the sword to trap Mallock with a glowing chain, declaring Mallock under arrest and himself the new King of Ashlar. Following Mallock's defeat, Hogar is freed from his restrains and the skeleton army dissolves into smoke, leaving Clutch's team and the knights to celebrate their victory. Varen is then officially declared the new King, and when Clutch and his team transport Mallock back to Lego City, Varen thanks him for being loyal and for being part of the team. The team then returns to Lego City, allowing the authorities to send the imprisoned Mallock back to the prison planet. Congratulating the team for their efforts, Playwell tells them that Omega is still on the loose. Encouraged with a newfound belief in teamwork, the team head onward to a new adventure to capture the criminal.

Reception

Commercial performance 
The film grossed $69,988 worldwide.

In its opening weekend, the film grossed $38,668 in 63 theatres, with an average of $613 per theatre.

Critical reception 

Common Sense Media gave it 3 out of 5 stars, saying it was a "clever, witty adventure--but also one big Lego ad."

Other media
Clutch Powers has appeared as a recurring character in the computer-animated series Ninjago. He first appeared in the eleventh season in 2019-20 and reappeared in the fourteenth season in 2021.

References

External links
 
 

2010 films
Universal Pictures direct-to-video animated films
Universal Pictures direct-to-video films
2010 computer-animated films
Direct-to-video animated films
Adventures of Clutch Powers
American animated comedy films
2010s adventure comedy films
2010s American animated films
2010 comedy films
2010s English-language films